The Zhuhai Open is a professional tennis tournament played on hard courts. It is currently part of the ATP Challenger Tour and the ITF Women's Circuit. It is held annually in Zhuhai, China, since 2015.

Past finals

Men's singles

Men's doubles

Women's singles

Women's doubles

References

External links 
 ITF search
 Zhuhai Open

 
ATP Challenger Tour
ITF Women's World Tennis Tour
Hard court tennis tournaments
Tennis tournaments in China
Sport in Zhuhai
2015 establishments in China
Recurring sporting events established in 2015
Sports competitions in Guangdong